Vitaliy Ponomarenko (March 18, 1974 – February 5, 2008) was a Ukrainian powerlifting champion. Ponomarenko weighed 220 lbs. At the time of his death he still holds the second highest bench press with a 782-pound press. He died on 5 February 2008 due to a heart condition.

References

 Web page dedicated Vitaliy http://powerliftingukraine.org.ua/hall-of-fame-wpc-wpo-ukraine-ponomarenko-vitaliy-html

1975 births
2008 deaths
Ukrainian male weightlifters